Eclimini is a tribe of bee flies in the family Bombyliidae. This tribe was formerly considered a subfamily of Bombyliidae, but was transferred to the subfamily Bombyliinae as a result of research published in 2019.

Genera
These seven genera belong to the tribe Eclimini:
 Cyrtomyia Bigot, 1892
 Eclimus Loew, 1844
 Lepidophora Westwood, 1835
 Palintonus François, 1964
 Thevenetimyia Bigot, 1875
 Tillyardomyia Tonnoir, 1927
 † Alepidophora Cockerell, 1909

References

External links

 

Bombyliidae